Richland High School is a small, rural public high school located at One Academic Avenue, Johnstown, Pennsylvania. In the 2016–2017, Richland High School enrollment was reported as 762 pupils in 7th through 12th grades. Richland High School is the sole high school operated by Richland School District.

Extracurriculars
The Richland School District offers a wide variety of clubs, activities and an extensive sports program.

Sports
The school provides the following:
Varsity

Boys
Baseball - AA
Basketball- AA
Cross country - A
Football - AA
Golf - AA
Indoor track and field - AAAA
Soccer - A
Swimming and diving - AA
Tennis - AA
Track and field - AA
Wrestling - AA

Girls
Basketball - AA
Cheerleading - AAAA
Cross country - A
Indoor track and field -  AAAA
Soccer - A
Softball - AA
Swimming and diving - AAA
Tennis - AAA
Track and field - AA
Volleyball - AA

Junior high school sports

Boys
Basketball
Cross country
Football
Soccer
Track and field
Wrestling 

Girls
Basketball
Cross country
Soccer 
Track and field
Volleyball

According to PIAA directory July 2015

Richland school colors are Red and Blue and its mascot is the Ram. Its main rivals include Bishop McCort, Westmont Hilltop High School and Forest Hills High School.

Notable alumni

Ronald Machtley, politician

References

External links 
 Richland School District

Public high schools in Pennsylvania
School buildings completed in 2007
Schools in Cambria County, Pennsylvania
2007 establishments in Pennsylvania